The Men's under-23 road race of the 2016 UCI Road World Championships took place in Doha, Qatar, on October 13, 2016.

Results

References

Men's under-23 road race
UCI Road World Championships – Men's under-23 road race
2016 in men's road cycling